Roberts Mežeckis (born 29 January 1981) is a retired Latvian professional footballer, currently the general manager and team coordinator of Latvia national under-21 football team.

Career 
Roberts Mežeckis was born in Riga, the son of the Latvian Football Federation general manager Jānis Mežeckis.

He signed for Cork City FC from F.K. Riga at the start of the 2009 season. Unfortunately Roberts' first team chances that season were limited due to ongoing injury problems. After the players were told they were effectively free agents, Mezeckis left the club on 30 July 2009. In September 2009 he announced his retirement from professional football, due to his long-term tendon of Achilles injury.

Post-football career 

In 2012 Mežeckis was appointed as the general manager and team coordinator of Latvia national under-21 football team.

External links 
Mezeckis released by Cork City

1981 births
Living people
Cork City F.C. players
League of Ireland players
Latvian footballers
Latvia international footballers
Footballers from Riga
Latvian expatriate footballers
Expatriate association footballers in the Republic of Ireland
Latvian expatriate sportspeople in Ireland
Skonto FC players
FK Rīga players
Association football defenders